Horky nad Jizerou is a municipality and village in Mladá Boleslav District in the Central Bohemian Region of the Czech Republic. It has about 600 inhabitants.

Geography
It lies in a flat agricultural landscape in the Jizera Table. The municipality is situated on the right bank of the Jizera River, which forms the eastern municipal border.

References

External links

Villages in Mladá Boleslav District